Barry Mitchell may refer to:

Barrie Mitchell (1947–2021), Scottish footballer
Barry Mitchell (comedian) (born 1952), American television personality
Barry Mitchell (basketball) (born 1965), American former professional basketball player
Barry Mitchell (footballer) (born 1965), former Australian rules footballer
Barry Mitchell, mathematician, see Mitchell's embedding theorem

See also
Mitchell (surname)